Apaturris is a genus of sea snails, marine gastropod mollusks in the family Borsoniidae.

Species in this genus have a relatively deep anal sinus.

Species
Species within the genus Apaturris include:
 Apaturris costifera May, 1920
 Apaturris expeditionis (Oliver, 1915)
Species brought into synonymy
 Apaturris brazieri Hedley, C. 1918: synonym of Scrinium brazieri (Smith, 1891)

References

 Tom Iredale (1917), More Molluscan Name-Changes, Generic and Specific; Oxford Journals Science & Mathematics Journal of Molluscan Studies Volume 12, Issue 6 Pp. 322-330

External links
  Bouchet, P.; Kantor, Y. I.; Sysoev, A.; Puillandre, N. (2011). A new operational classification of the Conoidea. Journal of Molluscan Studies. 77, 273-308